Mamraj Agrawal is an Indian social worker from Kolkata, West Bengal and the founder of Mamraj Agarwal Foundation, a Kolkata-based non governmental organization known to be involved in charity and philanthropic efforts. Through the foundation, Agrawal is reported to be involved in social service in education, healthcare and rehabilitation sectors. He was honored by the Government of India, in 2011, with the fourth highest Indian civilian award of Padma Shri.

References

External links
 

Living people
Recipients of the Padma Shri in social work
Scholars from Kolkata
Social workers from West Bengal
Year of birth missing (living people)